McMullin may refer to:
McMullin, Missouri
McMullin (surname)
Evan McMullin, candidate for President of the United States in the 2016 United States presidential election